Gotham Games, Inc. was an American video game publisher based in New York City. Founded in July 2002 and headed by Jamie Leece, the company was shut down in December 2003.

History 
Gotham Games was launched as a publishing label and subsidiary of Take-Two Interactive on July 22, 2002, with Take-Two Interactive's vice-president of publishing and business development, Jamie Leece, promoted to Gotham Games' president. At the time, Gotham Games was the third label for Take-Two Interactive, after Rockstar Games and Gathering of Developers, because of which Take-Two Interactive ceased publishing under their self-named label, citing a "global branding strategy".

At the May 2003 Electronic Entertainment Expo, Gotham Games announced that they were seeking new video game developers who were willing to have their game published by them. On December 18, 2003, Take-Two Interactive's chief executive officer, Jeffrey Lapin, announced that Gotham Games had been dissolved as part of a "larger internal reorganization".

Games published

References 

Take-Two Interactive divisions and subsidiaries
2002 establishments in New York City
2003 disestablishments in New York (state)
Defunct companies based in New York City
Video game companies established in 2002
Video game companies disestablished in 2003
Defunct video game companies of the United States
Video game publishers